Santo is a Spanish-Brazilian crime action thriller television series with occult detective fiction elements created by Carlos López and directed by .

Premise 
The plot takes place in between Madrid and Salvador. It concerns about two police agents from Spain and Brazil chasing a drug trafficker (Santo) whose face has never been revealed connected to occult-adjacent crimes.

Cast

Production 
Created by Carlos López,  took over the direction of the episodes. A co-production for Netflix by companies from Spain and Brazil, Santo was produced by Nostromo Pictures alongside Prodigo Films.

Release 
Netflix set a 16 September 2022 release date for the 6-episode series.

References 

2020s Spanish drama television series
2020s Brazilian television series
2022 Spanish television series debuts
2022 Brazilian television series debuts
Television shows set in Salvador
Television shows set in Madrid
Portuguese-language Netflix original programming
Spanish-language Netflix original programming
Spanish action television series
Brazilian action television series
Spanish crime television series
Brazilian crime television series
Spanish thriller television series
Brazilian thriller television series
Works about organized crime in Brazil